Varades is a former commune in the Loire-Atlantique department in western France. On 1 January 2016, it was merged into the new commune of Loireauxence.

Twinning
Varades has since August 2009 been twinned with the small Welsh/English border town of Knighton.

See also
Communes of the Loire-Atlantique department

References

Former communes of Loire-Atlantique
Populated places disestablished in 2016